The Consumer Insurance (Disclosure and Representations) Act 2012  (c.6) is a UK Act of Parliament that makes important reforms to insurance law.

The Act was a consequence of the Law Commission's millennium review of the law of insurance that has been ongoing since 2006.  The review examined insurance in general, and of marine insurance in particular.  The new legislation is a response to a consensus that the Marine Insurance Act 1906 is old-fashioned, it no longer represents current practice, and it undermines the continuing dominant position of English Insurance in the global market.

The Act has since been complemented by the Insurance Act 2015; and both of these modern Acts have significantly amended the Marine Insurance Act 1906, particularly in the area of misrepresentation and disclosure.

The Act's provisions
The Consumer Insurance (Disclosure and Representations) Act 2012 makes provisions as follows:  
  Section 1 creates the concept of "consumer" and "non-consumer" insurance contracts..
 Section 2 covers Pre-contractual disclosures and representations to the insurer.  The Act imposes a duty upon the insured to take reasonable care not to make a misrepresentation to the insurer. 
 Section 3 declares that the Standard of Care is to be determined in the light of all the relevant circumstances.
 Sections 4 defines "qualifying misrepresentations: definitions and remedies".
 Sections 5 defines "qualifying misrepresentations: classification and presumptions".
 Section 6 covers warranties and representations
 Schedule 1 makes provision for Insurers' remedies for qualifying misrepresentations.
 Schedule 2 makes provision for rules determining the status of agents

See also
 UK commercial law
 Marine Insurance

Notes

 

United Kingdom Acts of Parliament 2012
United Kingdom contract law
Insurance legislation
Insurance in the United Kingdom